Chfc, CHFC or ChFC may refer to:

 Chartered Financial Consultant
 CHFC (AM), a radio rebroadcaster (1230 AM) licensed to Churchill, Manitoba, Canada, rebroadcasting CBWK-FM
 CHFC-TV, a former television retransmitter (channel 8) licensed to Churchill, Manitoba, Canada, retransmitting CBWT
 Chainat Hornbill F.C.
 Colney Heath F.C.
 Cork Hibernians F.C.